Stubben is the name of a railway station on the Cuxhaven to Bremen line, situated in the village of Stubben in the district of Cuxhaven in Lower Saxony, one of the states of Germany.

Operational usage
RegionalBahn trains from Bremerhaven to Bremen call at the station, offering an hourly connection to both cities, with some peak services during the early morning and afternoon hours. A park and ride facility is situated close to the station. 
Local initiatives are lobbying for the RegionalExpress trains between Bremen and Bremerhaven to call at Stubben after modernisation.

References

Buildings and structures in Cuxhaven (district)
Railway stations in Lower Saxony
Bremen S-Bahn